Nikzad Nodjoumi, more commonly known as Nicky Nodjoumi (born 1942) is an Iranian-born American fine art painter. He currently lives and works in Brooklyn, New York. His paintings address Iranian politics, history, power and corruption.

Early life 
Nikzad Nodjoumi was born in 1942 in Kermanshah, Iran. In 1961, he studied Fine Arts at the School of Fine Art at Tehran University and in 1969 studied English at The New School in New York. In 1969, he came to the United States initially to have surgery in the Bronx for a congenital heart defect.

He married artist, Nahid Hagigat in 1973. In 1974, he received his Master's degree in Fine Arts from the City College of New York.

Career 

He returned to Iran after his studies and was making artwork and posters that criticized the Shah's regime. During the Iranian Revolution he was exiled from Iran and by 1981 he had moved back to New York City.

His most recent paintings from his show "Nicky Nodjoumi: Chasing the Butterfly and Other Recent Paintings" have an absurd mockery about them. With objects such as mullahs, men in suits, horses and apes sharing canvas space with figures from classical Persian paintings.

Nodjoumi's artwork has exhibited at various galleries and museums and are in collections worldwide, including the Metropolitan Museum of Art in New York; the British Museum in London; the DePaul Art Museum in Chicago; and the National Museum of Cuba.

References

1942 births
Iranian emigrants to the United States
City College of New York alumni
The New School alumni
People from Kermanshah
University of Tehran alumni
Iranian revolutionaries
Iranian painters
Living people
20th-century American painters
21st-century American painters